The Central Makran Range is a mountain range in the Makran region, in southwestern section of Balochistan Province, in southwestern Pakistan.

Geography
It is one of three ranges in the mountain ranges system.

Mirani Dam across the Dasht River forms a reservoir in the range, to provide irrigation water in the region and drinking water for the city of Gwadar.

Geology
The Central Makran Range is primarily made up of limestone and sandstone. It was formed when the northwestern Indian Plate collided with the Asian Plate.

Adjacent ranges
There are three main ranges in Balochistan: 
the Makran Coastal Range (up to about ); 
the Central Makran Range; 
the Siahan Range.

See also
Geography of Balochistan, Pakistan
Makran

References

External links
 NASA Images: Makran Ranges

CMakran
CMakran